John Sullivan "Sully" Glasser (October 25, 1922 – August 1, 1986) was a Canadian football player who played for the Saskatchewan Roughriders.

References

1922 births
1986 deaths
Players of Canadian football from Saskatchewan
Saskatchewan Roughriders players
Sportspeople from Regina, Saskatchewan